Henry Walton Smith (1738 – 23 August 1792) was the founder of W. H. Smith, one of the United Kingdom's largest bookselling and newspaper vending businesses.

Career
Brought up in Wrington in Somerset, Henry Walton Smith moved to London and became a personal assistant to Charles Rogers, an English customs official and art collector.

In 1792, together with his wife Anna, he founded his news vending business in London.

He died only a few months later on 23 August 1792.

Family
In 1784 he married Anna Eastaugh, a servant girl (1756-c. 1816), leading to the loss of his inheritance. They went on to have two sons, Henry Edward Smith and William Henry Smith, and one daughter, Mary Anne Smith.

References

1738 births
1792 deaths
British retail company founders
English businesspeople
People from Wrington